The VRC St Leger is a Listed Thoroughbred horse race for three-year-olds, run at set weights with penalties, over a distance of 2800 metres at Flemington Racecourse, Melbourne, Australia on ANZAC Day.

History

First run in 1857, the race was originally held in March as part of the Victoria Racing Club Autumn Carnival. In 1907 the race was run on the same race card as the Newmarket Handicap.

In an effort to promote the Australian Thoroughbred breeding industry, from 1932 to 1956 geldings were banned from competing in the St. Leger.
Past St Leger Stakes winners include Australian Racing Hall of Fame inductees Grand Flaneur (1881), Poseidon (1907), Phar Lap (1930), Tranquil Star (1941) and Tulloch (1958). Several winners also captured Australia's most prestigious race, the Melbourne Cup. They are: Grand Flaneur (1881), Phar Lap (1930), Comic Court (1949), Delta (1950), and Gurner's Lane (1982). In 1956, Sailor's Guide won the race and in 1958 raced in North America where he defeated a top international field in the forerunner to the Breeders' Cup Turf, the then very prestigious Washington, D.C. International Stakes.

Venue
The St. Leger was hosted by Moonee Valley Racecourse in 2001 and again in 2007 due to track refurbishments being carried out at the Flemington racecourse.

Distance
The race was held over a distance of 14 furlongs, 132 yards until 1973 when it was modified to the metric distance of 2800 metres. In 1975 the race was run over 2700 metres. In 2001 and 2007, the distance was changed to 2500 metres when the race was run at Moonee Valley Racecourse while Flemington was under redevelopment.

Grade
1857–1979 - Principal Race
1980–1990 - Group 2
1991–2005 - Group 3
2006 onwards - Listed Race

Records
Previously tied with T.J. Smith at six wins, in 2005 Bart Cummings set the record for most victories by a trainer when he won the race for the seventh time.

Winners

2022 - Alegron
2021 - Through Irish Eyes
2020 - Sacramento
2019 - Transact
2018 - Runaway
2017 - Dornier
2016 - Cool Chap
2015 - Authoritarian
2014 - Order of the Sun
2013 - Hippopus   
2012 - Vatuvei   
2011 - Right Of Refusal    
2010 - Exceptionally      
2009 - Berlioz     
2008 - †Inkster / Moment In Time  
2007 - Lazer Sharp  
2006 - Dolphin Jo  
2005 - Accumulate
2004 - Desert Clearance
2003 - Sir Pentire
2002 - Grey Song
2001 - Big Pat
2000 - Teddy Bear
1999 - Sunday Gold
1998 - Bohemiath
1997 - Wexford
1996 - St Shannon
1995 - Count Chivas
1994 - Gossips
1993 - Headcutter
1992 - Dark Ksar
1991 - Shivas Revenge
1990 - Frontier Boy
1989 - Waiaupal
1988 - Full At Last
1987 - Sharks Fin
1986 - Enchanteur
1985 - Waratahbay
1984 - Katies Boy
1983 - Lady Plutus
1982 - Gurner's Lane
1981 - Rio de Janeiro
1980 - Shogun
1979 - Rough N Tumble
1978 - So Called
1977 - Vacuum
1976 - Lord Dudley
1975 - Taras Bulba
1974 - Herminia
1973 - Godfather
1972 - Stop The Show
1971 - Trader
1970 - Epidaurus
1969 - King Pedro
1968 - Agena
1967 - Khalif
1966 - Prince Grant
1965 - Versailles
1964 - Better Lad
1963 - King Cobbler
1962 - Hansie
1961 - Reinsman
1960 - Nilarco
1959 - Chicola
1958 - Tulloch
1957 - Summalu
1956 - Sailor's Guide
1955 - Pride Of Egypt
1954 - Cromis
1953 - Arbroath
1952 - Hydrogen
1951 - Midway
1950 - Delta
1949 - Comic Court
1948 - Lungi
1947 - Amelia
1946 - Gay Lad
1945 - New Yorker
1944 - Lawrence
1943 - Amazed
1942 - High Road
1941 - Tranquil Star
1940 - Reading
1939 - Tempest
1938 - Hua
1937 - Peerage
1936 - Allunga
1935 - Sylvandale
1934 - †Hall Mark  / Limarch 
1933 - Oratory
1932 - Middle Watch
1931 - Veilmond
1930 - Phar Lap 
1929 - Strephon
1928 - Trivalve
1927 - Epilogue
1926 - Belgamba
1925 - Spearfelt
1924 - Sandringham
1923 - Caserta
1922 - Furious
1921 - Nautical
1920 - Artilleryman
1919 - Eusebius
1918 - Prince Viridis
1917 - Colbert
1916 - Patrobas
1915 - Mountain Knight
1914 - Radnor
1913 - Wolawa
1912 - Wilari
1911 - Danaus
1910 - Prince Foote
1909 - Even Time
1908 - Mountain King
1907 - Poseidon
1906 - Lady Wallace
1905 - Munderah
1904 - Scottish King
1903 - Abundance
1902 - Grasspan
1901 - Finland
1900 - Parthian
1899 - Bobadil
1898 - Aurum
1897 - The Officer
1896 - Cabin Boy
1895 - Preston
1894 - Patron
1893 - Culloden
1892 - Strathmore
1891 - Gibraltar
1890 - Dreadnought
1889 - Volley
1888 - Abercorn
1887 - Trident
1886 - Matchlock
1885 - Silver King
1884 - Martini Henry
1883 - Navigator
1882 - Commotion
1881 - Grand Flaneur
1880 - Caspian
1879 - Bosworth
1878 - First King
1877 - Adelaide
1876 - Richmond
1875 - Melbourne
1874 - Sea Spray
1873 - Blue Peter II
1872 - Hamlet
1871 - The Fawn
1870 - Lamplighter
1869 - Gasworks
1868 - Fireworks
1867 - Fishhook
1866 - Angler
1865 - Illumination
1864 - Oriflamme
1863 - Barwon
1862 - Camden
1861 - Presto
1860 - Flying Buck
1859 - Brownlock
1858 - Fusilier
1857 - Artaxerxes

† Dead heat

See also
The VRC St. Leger is one of a number of similar events around the world, although many are no longer restricted to three-year-olds. European variations include the Irish St. Leger, the Prix Royal-Oak, the Deutsches St. Leger and the St. Leger Italiano. Other national equivalents include the Kikuka Shō, the New Zealand St. Leger and the English St. Leger Stakes held at Doncaster.

References

Horse races in Australia
Flat horse races for three-year-olds
Recurring events established in 1857
Flemington Racecourse
1857 establishments in Australia